Alison Grace Thornton (born August 14, 1999) is a Canadian-American actress. She is best known for playing Zooey Hernandez Frumpkis in Girlfriends' Guide to Divorce, and Lydia Spring in Dirk Gently's Holistic Detective Agency.

Early life
Alison Grace Thornton was born in Vancouver, British Columbia, Canada to American parents Allen Thornton and Wendy Loken Thornton (both psychology professors), who immigrated to Canada and became citizens. She has an older sister, Emily Marie Thornton. 

Thornton graduated from Dr. Charles Best Secondary School in 2017 and is currently attending Simon Fraser University. She is fluent in both English and French. She currently lives in Vancouver and Los Angeles.

Career
Thornton began performing at the age of five in dance, singing, piano, and theater at Place des Arts in Coquitlam, British Columbia. In her first television role, she played Angeline Bennett in the Hallmark Channel movie Let It Snow starring Candace Cameron Bure and Alan Thicke.  She then played Charlotte Spehn in the movie The Color of Rain with Lacey Chabert. She played Zooey Hernandez Frumpkis for 26 episodes of Bravo's first scripted series, Girlfriends' Guide to Divorce, and Lydia Spring in Dirk Gently's Holistic Detective Agency, alongside Elijah Wood. In 2018, she was cast as Bethany Forrest in the independent film The Mental State. 

Initially cast as a guest star for the pilot episode, she was promoted to a series regular role as Tacy Cassidy in the TV adaptation of the Megan Abbott novel Dare Me., which premiered December 29, 2019. 

In addition to acting, Thornton is an avid writer. When she was in the eleventh grade, her class was encouraged to enter their short stories into a writing competition with publication as the prize. Her short story "Five Rings" was selected and appears in The Lost Door. When she moved to LA at 18, she entered her work into a poetry reading session. "His Moon" was selected for publication by Ariel's Dream Literary Journal.

Filmography

References

External links

1999 births
Living people
Actresses from Vancouver
Canadian film actresses
Canadian television actresses
21st-century American actresses
21st-century Canadian actresses
American television actresses
American film actresses
Canadian people of American descent